Catharina Peeters (1615–1676) was the sister of Bonaventuur Peeters, Jan Peeters I, and Gillis Peeters. They were all Flemish Baroque painters noted for painting seascapes.

Biography
Few details of her life are known. According to the RKD, she was taught to paint by her brothers. She is mentioned in Cornelis de Bie's book on painters in his chapter on noteworthy female painters. She is mentioned in Van der Aa as a fruit painter who was possibly the same person as Clara Peeters. Whether the two women were related is unknown.

References

Flemish women painters
Flemish marine artists
Flemish Baroque painters
1615 births
1676 deaths
17th-century women artists